The streak-capped treehunter (Thripadectes virgaticeps) is a species of bird in the family Furnariidae.

It is found in Colombia, Ecuador, and Venezuela. Its natural habitat is subtropical or tropical moist montane forests.

References

External links
Photo-Medium Res; Article www.ornithomedia.com-Ornithomedia.com: le web de l'ornithologie

streak-capped treehunter
Birds of the Colombian Andes
Birds of the Ecuadorian Andes
Birds of the Venezuelan Andes
Birds of the Venezuelan Coastal Range
streak-capped treehunter
Taxonomy articles created by Polbot